The  Premium Residency, informally known as the Saudi Green Card, is a residence permit in Saudi Arabia that grants expatriates the right to live, work and own business and property in the Kingdom without need for a sponsor. The scheme aims to attract highly skilled and wealthy foreign nationals as well as investors and entrepreneurs. The introduction of the Premium Residency comes as a part of Saudi Arabia's Vision 2030 reform plan, which was announced by Crown Prince Mohammed bin Salman to boost the Saudi economy. The permanent residency is granted for SAR800,000 (US$213,000 as of 2022) while the one-year renewable residency costs SAR100,000 ($26,660).

The scheme is separate from the current iqama residency because it grants more of the rights and privileges given to permanent residents in other countries. Current Saudi iqama holders must have a sponsor and must still regularly renew their permits based upon their employment status as well as the government's migration policy decisions. These have often changed over time with increased restrictions and fees. They are forbidden from independently owning property, vehicles, businesses, and investments in the country.

Requirements 
Qualifying applicants are required to have a valid passport and evidence of sufficient financial resources. The renewable permit is issued for one-year and can be renewable for an unlimited number of times.

Benefits 
Eligible foreigners enjoy some benefits, including recruiting workers, owning businesses, property, and means of transportation. Generally, they will be granted equal rights to Saudis in most cases. The permit does not grant citizenship and other laws pertaining to non-Saudis, such as restrictions against working in certain reserved occupations, still apply.

See also
Foreign workers in Saudi Arabia

References 

 Premium Residency Center
 Eligibility requirements for Premium Residency

Saudi Arabian nationality law
Residence permit
2019 establishments in Saudi Arabia